Payet is a surname, and may refer to:
 Alain Payet (1947–2007), French director of porn movies
 Anne-Marie Payet (born 1949), French politician, representing Réunion
 David Payet, Seychelles politician
 Dimitri Payet (born 1987), French football player
 Jacques Payet (born 1957), French aikido master
 Laëtitia Payet (born 1985), French judoka
 Manu Payet (born 1975), French comedian and actor
 Marie Payet (b. 1992), beauty pageant winner from Réunion
 Pascal Payet (born 1963), French criminal, serial escaper from prison
 Rolph Payet (born 1968), researcher and speaker on environmental policy

See also
 Payette (disambiguation)